OTC may refer to:

Finance

 Over-the-counter (finance)
 One time charge, for example in the big bath technique
 Order to cash process

Science, medicine, and technology

 On-tape Catalog, a section of a Microsoft Tape Format file
 OpenType Collection (OTC), a file format for bundling multiple OpenType fonts
 Orbiter test conductor, part of NASA's Launch Control Center
 Ornithine transcarbamylase, also called OTC gene or ornithine carbamoyltransferase
 Over-the-counter drug
 Oxytetracycline

Arts, entertainment, and media
 Offworld Trading Company, a real-time strategy video game
 The Olivia Tremor Control, a band
 Opera Theatre Company, since 2018 merged to form Irish National Opera
 OTC (band), a Congolese soukous group

Brands and enterprises
 Oliver Typewriter Company, a former US company
 Open Text Corporation, a Canadian software company
 Oriental Trading Company, based in Omaha, Nebraska
 Oshkosh Truck Corporation, former name of the Oshkosh Corporation
 OTC Markets Group, a private company that provides services to the US over-the-counter securities market
 OTC Tool Company, originally the Owatonna Tool Company

Organizations

Education
 Oakwood Technology College, in Rotherham, South Yorkshire
 Okefenokee Technical College, in Waycross and Alma, in the US state of Georgia
 Ozarks Technical Community College, in Springfield, Missouri
 Roy Campanella Occupational Training Center, public high school in Brooklyn, New York

Government
 Office of Transportation Cooperatives
 Ohio Turnpike Commission
 Oklahoma Tax Commission
 Overseas Telecommunications Commission, Australia's former international telecommunications service

Military
 Officer in tactical command
 Officers' Training Corps

Other organizations
 Offshore Technology Conference, an organization that holds conferences on offshore energy technology, based in Houston, Texas
 One Thousand Children, child survivors of the Holocaust who fled to America without their parents
 Oregon Track Club, an athletic association

Places
 Bol-Bérim Airport, by IATA-Code
 Odenton Town Center
 Ogilvie Transportation Center, Chicago, Illinois
 Overlake Transit Center
 United States Olympic Training Center, training facility for US Olympic and Paralympic athletes

See also
 Oct (disambiguation)